Fepuleai Seminary Iakopo is a former Samoan politician. He was a member of the Legislative Assembly of Samoa from 1982 to 1988.

Fepuleai was first elected to the Legislative Assembly in a by-election in 1982. He gave his first speech on 28 February and 1 March 1983. He lost his seat at the 1988 election. He later moved to New Zealand, where he ran three companies providing labour to fruit and vegetable growers. In 1991 he was made a Justice of the peace. He was bankrupted between 1997 and 2000. In 2009 he was convicted of 46 counts of GST and income tax evasion involving more than $800,000 of unpaid tax, and sentenced to two year's home detention.

In August 2022 he supported New Zealand Green Party MP Teanau Tuiono's member's bill to repeal the Citizenship (Western Samoa) Act 1982, which had stripped Samoans of New Zealand citizenship.

References

Living people
Samoan expatriates in New Zealand
Members of the Legislative Assembly of Samoa
New Zealand justices of the peace
New Zealand criminals
Year of birth missing (living people)